Richard Elmer Pabst (November 3, 1933 – September 18, 2012) was a member of the Wisconsin State Assembly.

Biography
Pabst was born on November 3, 1933, in Milwaukee, Wisconsin. After graduating from Pius XI High School, Pabst attended Milwaukee Area Technical College and the University of Wisconsin–Milwaukee. He also served in the United States Army.

Pabst died on September 18, 2012. He had two children and five grandchildren with his wife, Ruth.

Political career
Pabst was elected to the Assembly in 1966. He was a Democrat.

References

Politicians from Milwaukee
Democratic Party members of the Wisconsin State Assembly
Military personnel from Wisconsin
United States Army soldiers
Milwaukee Area Technical College alumni
University of Wisconsin–Milwaukee alumni
1933 births
2012 deaths